The AbiBac is a French-German high school diploma offered in schools in France and Germany. It is the oldest of three bi-national high school programmes (sections binationales) introduced by the French state, the others being EsaBac (French-Italian) and BachiBac (French-Spanish). The AbiBac was created by a French-German agreement on 31 May 1994.

To obtain the AbiBac, German-speaking students take

 the Abitur exams in German, and exams in
 history or another social science subject in French and
 French literature in French.

French speakers sit

 the Baccalauréat exams in French, and exams in
 the subject histoire-géographie in German and
 German literature in German.

Schools 
, the French state offers the AbiBac at 88 schools in France and five schools (lycée français) in Germany. , 68 public schools in Germany offer the AbiBac, as well as the two private schools Deutsche Schule Paris and Moser Schule Berlin.

See also 

 French-German Baccalaureate
Other French bi-national high school programmes
BachiBac (French-Spanish)
EsaBac (French-Italian)

External links 

 Abibac (in French), on the website of the Centre international d'études pédagogiques
 L'AbiBac (in French), on the pages of the French ministry of education

References 

France–Germany relations